Bus Stop is a 26-episode American drama which aired on ABC from October 1, 1961, until March 25, 1962, starring Marilyn Maxwell as Grace Sherwood, the owner of a bus station and diner in the fictitious town of Sunrise in the Colorado Rockies. The program was adapted from William Inge's play, Bus Stop, and Inge was a script consultant for the series, which followed  the lives of travelers passing through the bus station and the diner. Maxwell's co-stars were Richard Anderson as District Attorney Glenn Wagner, Rhodes Reason as Sheriff Will Mayberry, Joan Freeman as waitress Elma Gahrigner, Bernard Kates as Ralph the coroner, and Buddy Ebsen as Virge Blessing. Increasingly, as it became difficult to have guest stars be characters arriving by bus every week, the stories became more about people in the town which left little for Maxwell's character to do and led to her leaving the series after 13 episodes.  She said, "There was nothing for me to do but pour a second cup of coffee and point the way to the men's room."

Episodes

Controversial episode

The episode "A Lion Walks Among Us", with guest star Fabian Forte and directed by Robert Altman, was highly controversial because of its depiction of violence. Twenty-five ABC affiliates refused to air the program. It attracted negative comment from politicians in Washington. The episode was shown to a Congressional Committee discussing violence on TV.

References

External links 

 

1961 American television series debuts
1962 American television series endings
American Broadcasting Company original programming
Television series by 20th Century Fox Television
1960s American drama television series
Black-and-white American television shows
Television shows set in Colorado
Live action television shows based on films
English-language television shows
Television series created by Roy Huggins
Buses in fiction
Television series set in restaurants